A list of rivers of the state Bremen, Germany:

B
Balge

G
Geeste

K
Kleine Weser and Werdersee

L
Lesum
Lune

O
Ochtum

S
Schönebecker Aue

V
Varreler Bäke

W
Weser
Westergate
Wümme

 
Bremen
Bremen-related lists